Arashi Syndrom is the third studio album by Deathline International, released on February 15, 1997 by COP International.

Reception

Jeremy Ulrey of AllMusic compares the band favorably to Skinny Puppy and The Human League and calling the album "not wholly original, but a successful rearranging of parts nonetheless." Black Monday credited the vocal performances as having improved over previous releases and said "solid, definite and without fear, Deathline have pushed their conglomerated staff of musicians forth with a sound that gets attention." Sonic Boom said the release "broadened the compositional diversity of both the electronics and percussion due to the synergy of the contributing artists." The critic concluded, "ultimately when you add all of these elements together you end up with a very well produced and assembled album." The album peaked at number twenty-one on CMJ New Music Monthly's top dance releases in 1997.

Track listing

Accolades

Personnel
Adapted from the Arashi Syndrom liner notes.

Deathline International
 Shawn Brice (as Spawn) – producer, executive-producer, engineering, keyboards and macintosh (3-5, 7, 8, 10), vocals (3, 8, 9), programming (11)
 Christian Petke (as Count 0) – producer, engineering, singing and macintosh (3-5, 7, 9, 11), keyboards (9), illustrations

Additional performers
 Holger Bartel – guitar (9)
 Kay Dolores – bass guitar (9, 11)
 Warren Harrison (War-N Harrison) – drums (11)
 Nial McGaughey – guitar (7, 10)
 Bernie Moon – drums (11)
 Mike Welch – guitar (3, 4, 5, 8), vocals (3, 8, 9)

Production and design
 Stefan Noltemeyer – mastering

Release history

References

External links 
 Arashi Syndrom at Discogs (list of releases)
  Arashi Syndrom at Bandcamp
 Arashi Syndrom at iTunes

1997 albums
Deathline International albums
COP International albums